Milky Mist Dairy, Milky Mist Dairy Food Private Limited (MMD), one of India's largest manufacturers of dairy products, is located at Perundurai,  from the Erode district in Tamil Nadu. Formed in 1997 by T. Sathish Kumar, Milky Mist is engaged in milk procurement, processing, and manufacturing of other dairy products.

History
The roots of MMD can be traced back to the 1990s when a young Mr. T Sathish Kumar obsessed with a desire to make it big in business took over his father's losses in milk distribution. He began the business primarily to turn it around and also support his family.

Initially, MMD's Plant was set up in a  piece of land in Chithode, Erode Dist. It is furnished with the latest technology to manufacture dairy products like curd, yogurt, mozzarella cheese, and paneer. 

The Mega Plant has also got various value-added product sections like ghee, butter, cheddar cheese, cream cheese, shrikhand, and lassi. It has a state-of-the-art spray dryer for converting liquid whey into VADPs.

In 2022 the company launched its own D2C eCommerce website and mobile app to directly connect with its consumers.

Growth
The company has been setting up India's largest single-location cheese making unit in Perundurai in the Erode district, about 430 km west of Chennai, with an investment outlay of 4.5 billion ₹. The company offers more than 20 products today, including paneer, cheese, ghee, cream and payasam, as opposed to the only three products sold in 2010. Future expansion plans in the Middle East and North America have pushed the company towards capitalising on these regions. Various global private equity funds are looking to buy a minority stake, valuing the company at 230 million $.

Products
The current product range includes Curd (Indian Yoghurt), Fresh Paneer, Mozzarella Cheese, Cheddar Cheese, Processed Cheese, Gouda cheese, Fresh and UHT Cream, UHT Milk, Butter, Ghee, Khova, Yoghurts, traditional milk-based products like Shrikhand, Payasam (Kheer), Mishti Doi, Spray dried products such as Dairy Whitener, Skimmed Milk Powder, and Whey Powder. Also, they have launched new products such as Probiotic Curd, Frozen Pizza, UHT Lassi.

Technology
MMD has got the largest fully-automated mozzarella plant in the country, which includes high-speed processing and packing machines which are the first of their kind in India. They possess a fully- automatic robotic line production facility for paneer with minimal human intervention. 
Some of Milky Mist's equipment are:
1000 slices/ minute high-speed cheese slice packing machine
60 MT/ day fully automatic paneer making plant with robotic packing
40 MT/ day fully automatic mozzarella cheese manufacturing plant
40 MT/ day cream cheese manufacturing plant

Sub brands
Smart Chef – Frozen Pizza

Briyas – Tofu paneer

Asal – Ready to eat Chapatis and Parottas, Idly Dosa Batter

Capella – Spreads

Production capacity
The Mega Plant with its composite dairy processing facilities can handle a large volume of milk and also meet the growing market demand. MMD procures 5+ lakh litres per day of milk directly from  56,000+ farmers spread over 8 districts of Tamil Nadu. MMD produces 25 different VADPs with 250+ SKUs, owns and operates the largest fleet of refrigerated vehicles for last-mile delivery of its products under controlled temperature conditions.

Milk procurement
As of date, Milky Mist has about 56000 farmer members associated with it for the procurement of milk. Milky Mist does not procure milk from Traders/ Vendors/ Agents or any middleman. Milk is directly sourced from the farmers and the farming community involved has been incorporated under financial inclusion as per RBI guidelines. The amount towards milk procurement is being transferred directly to the respective farmers’ bank accounts and hence cash transaction is obviated.

Farmer support

MMD also manufactures balanced cattle feed. Milky Mist has planted over 1 Lakh Trees and supported Self – Help Groups to revive Rivers & Lakes. Also, Milky Mist has built Modern toilets for Government schools under the CSR activity.

References

Economy of Erode
Companies based in Tamil Nadu
Dairy products companies of India
Companies based in Erode
1992 establishments in Tamil Nadu
Indian companies established in 1992
Food and drink companies established in 1992